Black Fork may refer to:

Black Fork, Arkansas, an unincorporated community
Black Fork (Cheat River) in West Virginia
Black Fork Mohican River in Ohio